Jeff Hartford, better known by his stage name Attlas (stylized as ATTLAS), is a Canadian DJ, electronic music producer and musician. Hartford is known for his progressive house and electronica releases on the electronic label mau5trap and has often appeared the label's We are Friends album series. He has released three albums, five extended plays, and several other singles and has received two Juno Award nominations over the course of his career. He is also half of the group Sun Lo with Richard Walters.

Early life 
Born in Toronto, Hartford grew up surrounded by a variety of musical influences, including New Orleans jazz, Beethoven, hip-hop, and hard rock. After moving to Detroit, he learned to play a piano that was left in the basement of his home and began composing his own music. Later, an interest in electronic music was fostered by listening to productions from Matt Lange, Deadmau5, and various artists from Warp Records. Before releasing his own music under the name Attlas, Hartford worked on film scores with composer Trevor Morris.

Career

2014-2015: Debut extended plays and deadmau5 alias rumors 
Hartford self-released a remix he had made of the Deadmau5 song "Aural Psynapse" in November 2014, which almost immediately gained attention and led to rumors being spread about the identity of the producer. Thanks to this positive attention Hartford decided to send his music to mau5trap, who signed him. The moniker "ATTLAS" was a sort of mask that he could put on to assume a new identity and separate his music from his personal self. The name was chosen both because the ambiguity would allow him to cover a variety of sounds, and because of the influence that physical and emotional geographies, histories, and stories have on his writing.

During the period when Hartford's songs were first released on mau5trap, a rumor circulated online that Attlas was a side project of Joel Zimmerman aka Deadmau5 akin to the Testpilot moniker Zimmerman debuted also in 2014. Some even theorized that the name was a reference to the video game Bioshock and was a clue to the secret nature of the project.  Although he mentioned his first name in some interviews, the true identity of Attlas was not fully known until Pete Tong revealed it on his Evolution broadcast on iHeartRadio. Tong said "There's been a sneaky suspicion that he's deadmau5 in disguise. However I can now reveal that he's a fellow Canadian producer called Jeff Hartford."

Speaking about the beginning of his career and how fans assumed he was an alias of deadmau5, Hartford said:

In 2015, Hartford released the singles "Scarlett", "Wastaga" and "Beside". These tracks were later included in a femme fatale-inspired EP trilogy consisting of Siren EP, Scene EP and Sin EP released through mau5trap throughout the year alongside an official release of his "Aural Psynapse" remix. He also performed his first live shows under the name Attlas in June.

2016-2017: Bloom EP and other singles 
In February 2016, Hartford joined other mau5trap label artists on the MAU5HAX BU5 TOUR across the United States. He then released the single "Aspen" in April. After a brief hiatus, he released another single, "Ryat", in June ahead of the full Bloom EP, a self-described collection of calm, fresh air and vocal collaborations. The EP saw general praise, and the track "I Need You More" was recognized on Billboard's Top 25 Relaxing & Calming Songs to Chill To playlist in 2017. He also released the song "Blood Work" in November.  At the end of 2016, Hartford embarked on a seven show tour across Canada and the United States to promote the second installment of his Storyline mix series and closed the year out by giving away the song "Thanks" for free to his Soundcloud followers as a way of expressing gratitude for his fans. Hartford was named in Billboard's "One to watch" for 2016.

In 2017, Hartford released the singles "Frost",  "Further", and "What You Do To Me". A collaboration with deadmau5 titled "bad at titles" was included on mau5trap's We are Friends, Vol. 6 compilation and received positive attention.

2018-2019: Charcoal Halo 
Hartford continued releasing various singles on mau5trap throughout 2018. "You (Close)", "Treehouse", "Want", and "Courante" were all released as separate singles before the announcement of the extended play Charcoal Halo. None of the previous singles from 2017 or 2018 were included on this EP. Hartford described the December release as an exploration of the balance between relying on experience and learning from self-reflection. Charcoal Halo was one of the first instances of Hartford re-sampling his own demos into new tracks, a technique that would feature heavily on later releases. The tone of the whole EP departed from the darker and more serious energy of the previous EPs but maintained the lush layering that Hartford had become known for. It also included a feature from singer 7Chariot on the song "Coldest Night".

Near the end of 2019, Hartford suffered an accident related to his foot that made activities like hiking, songwriting, and occasionally even sleep impossible for a time. Some of the ideas that came from this hardship eventually found their way onto later tracks, such as "Polar Concept" from his second album, Out Here with You.

2020-2021: Lavender God, Out Here with You, and other singles 

On November 17, 2019, Hartford announced via Twitter that he would be releasing his first full-length album early the following year. "Sinner Complicated", the first single from the album was unveiled on December 6, 2019 and was accompanied by a visualizer made by digital artist Cyclo. The following January saw the release of the second single, "Hotel" featuring Maylyn. The full album released in February, to positive reviews, being called "stunning", "soothing", "cinematic", and "an unprecedented adventure" by some. Lavender God featured collaborations with Lambert, Maylyn, and Alisa Xayalith (of The Naked and Famous fame) and would go on to be nominated for the Juno Award for Electronic Album of the Year. A tour to support the album was planned, but most events were canceled due to the spread of Covid-19 across North America. Hartford also released several other singles in the months following: the self-release "The Night Air was Cool" in July and the double single "Faya/The Crack" via Lane 8's record label This Never Happened in September.

Much to the surprise of fans, Hartford announced later that year that another album would be released in November 2020, less than a year after his debut album. This new album, titled Out Here with You, would see largely positive reviews and would also receive a Juno nomination for Electronic Album of the Year. Many of the songs on this album were the result of reflecting on the isolation during the pandemic as well as other positive and negative experiences in Hartford's life.

The following year, Hartford self-released a number of singles. To celebrate Piano Day in March, he released the instrumental track "86cc". June brought "Long Way Home", a collaboration with Anjunadeep's Oliver Wickham. A visualizer for the song was once again created by Cyclo. In August, Hartford released "Into Arms of Lovers" featuring Maylyn. The song had been in the works for a while, with Hartford often playing earlier versions in live sets. He called the song "an effort of passion and patience" and "an honest final product".

2022-present: Carry it with You and new band Sun Lo 
Mid-February 2022, the Attlas and mau5trap Twitter pages both announced that Hartford's third album, titled Carry it with You, would be released on March 11 and would be preceded by the single "Waterbug" on February 25. Hartford remarked that the album would be very personal, emotional, and vulnerable. Songs from the album were meant to convey a broad range of emotions, from dread and hope, to failure and frustration, to brutal honesty with oneself. Hartford listed a number of influences that contributed to the songs on Carry it with You, including the bands Boards of Canada, Prince of Denmark, Modern Baseball, O'Flynn, Vessels, and the painter William Kurelek,  The album received praise for the emotional depth conveyed and the diversity of sounds.

After featuring in a remix of Rolo Tomassi's song "Closer" in July, Hartford announced that he would be releasing a collaboration with producer Mango (Alexey Golovanov) on the label Monstercat. Appearing on the Silk sublabel, both artists described the song as an exploration of and reflection on nature, namely Lake Huron. Both were satisfied with the blend of styles on the track and attributed some of the success to the vocals contributed by singer Maylyn, who had worked with Hartford previously. In September the same year, Hartford tweeted that a new vocal-focused album was coming soon, which confirmed hints that he had dropped previously. This new material was later announced to be a collaboration with British singer-songwriter Richard Walters and would be released under the name Sun Lo. The duo released their debut single "Factory Gates" in November 2022 under Netwerk Music Group and followed it with "Nothing Permanent" in December the same year.

Discography

Albums

Extended plays

Singles and other songs

Remixes

Awards and nominations 

|-
 | 2021
| Juno Awards
| Electronic Album of the Year
| Lavender God
| 
| 
|-
|-
 | 2022
| Juno Awards
| Electronic Album of the Year
| Out Here with You
|

References 

Canadian DJs
Canadian electronic musicians
Living people
Mau5trap artists
Electronic dance music DJs
Year of birth missing (living people)
Monstercat Silk artists